R506 road may refer to:
 R506 road (Ireland)
 R506 road (South Africa)